Junction Corner is the junction point of the mainland with the west side of Shackleton Ice Shelf. It was discovered and named by the Australasian Antarctic Expedition, 1911–14, under Mawson.

References

Geography of Antarctica
Queen Mary Land